Sebastian Freiherr von Rotenhan (1 November 1949 – 26 October 2022) was a German baron, forester, and politician.

A member of the Christian Social Union in Bavaria, he served in the Landtag of Bavaria from 1998 to 2008.

Von Rotenhan died on 26 October 2022, at the age of 72.

References

1949 births
2022 deaths
20th-century German politicians
21st-century German politicians
Barons of Germany
Bavarian nobility
Members of the Landtag of Bavaria
Christian Social Union in Bavaria politicians
People from Bamberg